Haselton Glacier is a glacier flowing east-northeast between Gibson Spur and the Apocalypse Peaks, terminating as a hanging glacier at Barwick Valley in Victoria Land. Named in 2005 by the Advisory Committee on Antarctic Names in association with Haselton Icefall, a heavily crevassed upper part of the glacier.

References

Glaciers of Victoria Land